Kiosko was an unsold television pilot for a multicultural music education television series for children produced by KPBS television in San Diego, California.  It was nominated in 2008 for an Emmy award under the Children's Program or Special Category, Pacific Southwest Chapter of the National Television Academy.

The show's focus was on music education, using various forms of music from around the globe.  It featured a combination of live action, puppetry, and animation, similar to Sesame Street.

The pilot for the show was aired in August 2007, but the show was never picked up.

Staff
 Creators: Miguel-Angel Soria, Alejandra M. Gomez
 Music: Kevin P. Green
 Artistic Director / Associate Producer: Fernado Flores
 Associate Producer: Tim Foley (from the Irish folk music group Skelpin; also one of the show's writers and actors)

See also
The Biscuit Brothers (similar music series for children)

References

External links
 Kiosko (official website)

American television shows featuring puppetry
Unaired television pilots
Television pilots not picked up as a series